This is a list of Marathi (Indian Marathi-language) films that are scheduled to release in 2022

Box office Collection

January–June

July–December

References 

2022
2022 in Indian cinema
 
Marathi